Scott Hooper (born 14 January 1995) is a Scottish footballer who plays as a defender for Annan Athletic.

Hooper has previously played for Queen of the South, Annan Athletic, Peterhead and Kelty Hearts, as well as Queen's Park on loan.

Career
Born in Dumfries, Hooper began his career with local club Queen of the South and was included in the first team squad on 9 November 2013, as an unused substitute in a 1–0 home defeat against Hamilton Academical in the Scottish Championship. Hooper played on 3 May 2014 in the final league match of the campaign in a 1–1 draw against Cowdenbeath, playing the full 90 minutes.

In February 2016, Hooper signed on loan for Scottish League Two club Queen's Park who gained promotion that season on an emergency loan deal for a month. Hooper's contract at Queens wasn't renewed, and he was subsequently released in May 2017 after four seasons at Palmerston. Hooper remained in Dumfries and Galloway after signing for Scottish League Two club Annan Athletic on 14 June 2017.

Hooper signed with Peterhead in 2019 before moving to Kelty Hearts on 31 July 2020. On 1 March 2022, Hooper returned to former club Annan Athletic on loan for the remainder of the 2021–22 season. He then returned to Annan permanently during the 2022 close season.

Career statistics

105

References

External links

1995 births
Living people
Footballers from Dumfries
Scottish footballers
Association football defenders
Queen of the South F.C. players
Queen's Park F.C. players
Annan Athletic F.C. players
Scottish Professional Football League players
Peterhead F.C. players
Kelty Hearts F.C. players